Whispering Pines is a village in Moore County, North Carolina, United States. The population was 2,928 at the 2010 census.

Geography
Whispering Pines is located at  (35.255583, -79.370890).

Demographics

2020 census

As of the 2020 United States census, there were 4,987 people, 1,149 households, and 937 families residing in the village.

2000 census
As of the census of 2000, there were 2,090 people, 970 households, and 770 families residing in the village. The population density was 689.9 people per square mile (266.3/km2). There were 1,054 housing units at an average density of 347.9 per square mile (134.3/km2). The racial makeup of the village was 97.89% White, 1.15% African American, 0.24% Native American, 0.33% Asian, 0.10% Pacific Islander, 0.05% from other races, and 0.24% from two or more races. Hispanic or Latino of any race were 1.15% of the population.

There were 970 households, out of which 14.6% had children under the age of 18 living with them, 76.7% were married couples living together, 2.4% had a female householder with no husband present, and 20.6% were non-families. 19.3% of all households were made up of individuals, and 13.3% had someone living alone who was 65 years of age or older. The average household size was 2.15 and the average family size was 2.43.

In the village, the population was spread out, with 13.0% under the age of 18, 1.5% from 18 to 24, 13.9% from 25 to 44, 25.4% from 45 to 64, and 46.2% who were 65 years of age or older. The median age was 63 years. For every 100 females, there were 89.5 males. For every 100 females age 18 and over, there were 91.4 males.

The median income for a household in the village was $60,035, and the median income for a family was $66,587. Males had a median income of $48,906 versus $33,750 for females. The per capita income for the village was $33,086. About 0.5% of families and 1.2% of the population were below the poverty line, including 2.0% of those under age 18 and 1.0% of those age 65 or over.

Notable person
 Shannon Moore, TNA wrestler

References

External links
 Official website of Whispering Pines, NC
 Moore County Chamber of Commerce

Villages in Moore County, North Carolina